Dana Stewart Scott (born October 11, 1932) is an American logician who is the emeritus Hillman University Professor of Computer Science, Philosophy, and Mathematical Logic at Carnegie Mellon University; he is now retired and lives in Berkeley, California. His work on automata theory earned him the Turing Award in 1976, while his collaborative work with Christopher Strachey in the 1970s laid the foundations of modern approaches to the semantics of programming languages. He has worked also on modal logic, topology, and category theory.

Early career
He received his B.A. in Mathematics from the University of California, Berkeley, in 1954. He wrote his Ph.D. thesis on Convergent Sequences of Complete Theories under the supervision of Alonzo Church while at Princeton, and defended his thesis in 1958. Solomon Feferman (2005) writes of this period:

After completing his Ph.D. studies, he moved to the University of Chicago, working as an instructor there until 1960.  In 1959, he published a joint paper with Michael O. Rabin, a colleague from Princeton, titled Finite Automata and Their Decision Problem (Scott and Rabin 1959) which introduced the idea of nondeterministic machines to automata theory. This work led to the joint bestowal of the Turing Award on the two, for the introduction of this fundamental concept of computational complexity theory.

University of California, Berkeley, 1960–1963
Scott took up a post as Assistant Professor of Mathematics, back at the University of California, Berkeley, and involved himself with classical issues in mathematical logic, especially set theory and Tarskian model theory. He proved that the axiom of constructibility is incompatible with the existence of a measurable cardinal, a result considered seminal in the evolution of Set Theory.

During this period he started supervising Ph.D. students, such as James Halpern (Contributions to the Study of the Independence of the Axiom of Choice) and Edgar Lopez-Escobar (Infinitely Long Formulas with Countable Quantifier Degrees).

Modal and tense logic
Scott also began working on modal logic in this period, beginning a collaboration with John Lemmon, who moved to Claremont, California, in 1963.  Scott was especially interested in Arthur Prior's approach to tense logic and the connection to the treatment of time in natural-language semantics, and began collaborating with Richard Montague (Copeland 2004), whom he had known from his days as an undergraduate at Berkeley.  Later, Scott and Montague independently discovered an important generalisation of Kripke semantics for modal and tense logic, called Scott-Montague semantics (Scott 1970).

John Lemmon and Scott began work on a modal-logic textbook that was interrupted by Lemmon's death in 1966.  Scott circulated the incomplete monograph amongst colleagues, introducing a number of important techniques in the semantics of model theory, most importantly presenting a refinement of canonical model that became standard, and introducing the technique of constructing models through filtrations, both of which are core concepts in modern Kripke semantics (Blackburn, de Rijke, and Venema, 2001).  Scott eventually published the work as An Introduction to Modal Logic (Lemmon & Scott, 1977).

Stanford, Amsterdam and Princeton, 1963–1972
Following an initial observation of Robert Solovay, Scott formulated the concept of Boolean-valued model, as Solovay and Petr Vopěnka did likewise at around the same time. In 1967, Scott published a paper, A Proof of the Independence of the Continuum Hypothesis, in which he used Boolean-valued models to provide an alternate analysis of the independence of the continuum hypothesis to that provided by Paul Cohen. This work led to the award of the Leroy P. Steele Prize in 1972.

University of Oxford, 1972–1981
Scott took up a post as Professor of Mathematical Logic on the Philosophy faculty of the University of Oxford in 1972. He was member of Merton College while at Oxford and is now an Honorary Fellow of the college.

Semantics of programming languages
This period saw Scott working with Christopher Strachey, and the two
managed, despite administrative pressures, to do work on providing a mathematical foundation for the semantics of programming languages, the work for which Scott is best known. Together, their work constitutes the Scott–Strachey approach to denotational semantics, an important and seminal contribution to theoretical computer science. One of Scott's contributions is his formulation of domain theory, allowing programs involving recursive functions and looping-control constructs to be given denotational semantics. Additionally, he provided a foundation for the understanding of infinitary and continuous information through domain theory and his theory of information systems.

Scott's work of this period led to the bestowal of:
 The 1990 Harold Pender Award for his application of concepts from logic and algebra to the development of mathematical semantics of programming languages;
 The 1997 Rolf Schock Prize in logic and philosophy from the Royal Swedish Academy of Sciences for his conceptually oriented logical works, especially the creation of domain theory, which has made it possible to extend Tarski's semantic paradigm to programming languages as well as to construct models of Curry's combinatory logic and Church's calculus of lambda conversion; and
 The 2001 Bolzano Prize for Merit in the Mathematical Sciences by the Czech Academy of Sciences
 The 2007 EATCS Award for his contribution to theoretical computer science.

Carnegie Mellon University, 1981–2003
At Carnegie Mellon University, Scott proposed the theory of equilogical spaces as a successor theory to domain theory; among its many advantages, the category of equilogical spaces is a cartesian closed category, whereas the category of domains is not. In 1994, he was inducted as a Fellow of the Association for Computing Machinery. In 2012 he became a fellow of the American Mathematical Society.

Bibliography
 With Michael O. Rabin, 1959.  Finite Automata and Their Decision Problem. 
 1967.  A proof of the independence of the continuum hypothesis. Mathematical Systems Theory 1:89–111.
 1970. 'Advice in modal logic'.  In Philosophical Problems in Logic, ed. K. Lambert, pages 143–173.
 With John Lemmon, 1977.  An Introduction to Modal Logic. Oxford: Blackwell.

References

Further reading
Blackburn, de Rijke and Venema (2001). Modal logic. Cambridge University Press.
Jack Copeland (2004). Arthur Prior.  In the Stanford Encyclopedia of Philosophy.
Anita Burdman Feferman and Solomon Feferman (2004).  Alfred Tarski: life and logic. Cambridge University Press, .
Solomon Feferman (2005). Tarski's influence on computer science.  Proc. LICS'05. IEEE Press.
Joseph E. Stoy (1977). Denotational Semantics: The Scott-Strachey Approach to Programming Language Theory. MIT Press.

External links
  
 DOMAIN 2002 Workshop on Domain Theory  — held in honor of Scott's 70th birthday.
 
 
 Dana Scott interviewed by Gordon Plotkin, as part of the Association for Computing Machinery series of interviews of Turing award winners: Part 1 (Nov 12, 2020) Part 2 (Dec 29, 2020) Part 3 (Jan 12, 2021) Part 4 (Feb 18, 2021)
 Selected papers of Dana S. Scott

American computer scientists
American logicians
1932 births
Living people
Members of the United States National Academy of Sciences
Carnegie Mellon University faculty
Fellows of the Association for Computing Machinery
Fellows of the American Mathematical Society
Fellows of Merton College, Oxford
Formal methods people
Lattice theorists
Mathematical logicians
Modal logicians
Model theorists
Programming language researchers
Rolf Schock Prize laureates
Semanticists
Set theorists
Topologists
Turing Award laureates
University of Chicago faculty
University of California, Berkeley College of Letters and Science faculty
Tarski lecturers
Princeton University alumni
UC Berkeley College of Letters and Science alumni
People from Berkeley, California
Engineers from California
Scientists from California
20th-century American mathematicians
20th-century American engineers
21st-century American engineers
20th-century American scientists
21st-century American scientists
21st-century American mathematicians
Gödel Lecturers